Damian Jones (born 30 September 1964) is a British independent film producer.

His career spans almost 50 feature films that include collaborating with top directing and acting talent to critical and commercial success. Films include the Academy Award-winning The Iron Lady, The Lady in the Van, The History Boys, Belle, Welcome to Sarajevo, Millions, Goodbye Christopher Robin, Sex & Drugs & Rock & Roll, Dad's Army, Absolutely Fabulous: The Movie and the crime drama trilogy Kidulthood, Adulthood and Brotherhood.

Jones' most recent projects have included Michael Winterbottom's Greed for Sony Pictures International Productions and Film4, Rapman's Blue Story, Argyris Papadimitropoulos's Monday, Romola Garai’s Amulet, and Jim Archer’s Brian and Charles with Focus Features.

He is the founder of DJ Films Ltd. and was co-founder of Dragon Pictures and Mission Pictures.

Filmography

References

External links

Official Page

1964 births
Living people
English film producers